Indian feudalism refers to the feudal society that made up India's social structure until the Mughal Dynasty in the 16th century. The Guptas and the Kushans played a major role in the introduction and practice of feudalism in India, and are examples of the decline of an empire caused by feudalism.

Terminology 
Use of the term feudalism to describe India applies a concept of medieval European origin, according to which the landed nobility held lands from the Crown in exchange for military service, and vassals were in turn tenants of the nobles, while the peasants (villeins or serfs) were obliged to live on their lord's land and give him homage, labor, and a share of the produce, notionally in exchange for military protection. Feudalism is most likely introduced to India when the Kushan Dynasty from Central Asia invaded India and introduced new policies of their own. The term Indian feudalism is used to describe taluqdar, zamindar, jagirdar, ghatwals, mulraiyats, sardar, mankari, deshmukh, chaudhary and samanta. Most of these systems were abolished after the independence of India and the rest of the subcontinent. D. D. Kosambi and R. S. Sharma, together with Daniel Thorner, brought peasants into the study of Indian history for the first time.

Structure
Starting from the Gupta period the term samanta (feudal lord or nobleman) came to be applied to those granted land or to subjugated feudatory rulers. Weak enforcement of power over the conquered regions led to the resumption of independence and some high administrative positions became hereditary.
There is debate among historians whether the feudatory system in India qualifies as true feudalism, as apparently there was a lack of an economic contract between king, vassal and serf. Other historians however argue that the similarities are significant enough to describe it as feudalism. The essential characteristic was the decentralization of power. Samantas were officials granted lands instead of a salary and proceeded to seize ownership of the area while continuing to refer to themselves as vassals of their ruler. They were required to pay a small fraction of revenue and provide troops for the overlord. These lords often aped their royal suzerains, for instance, by constructing miniature royal palaces. This encouraged the fragmentation of authority and growing parochialism which has been suggested as a cause for the weak resistance against Muslim conquest.

Bihar

The Bihar region (now a state) of India was a hotbed for feudalism. Feudalism first started when the Kushans ruled over India and flourished when the Gupta Empire ruled over Northern India. .

Telangana
Doras and deshmukhs ruled the region until Hyderbad's annexation. They held all the land in their fief and everybody used to give their produce, and they used to be given barely enough food for sustenance. The rebellion against feudal lords, known as Vetti Chakiri Udhyamam, from 1946 to 1951 in Telangana region called as Telangana Rebellion illustrates the feudal society in the region. The feudal lords used to reside in a high fortress called as Gadi, for entering it they leave their footwear at the threshold of the gadi. The madigas and other backward classes were required to carry their footwear in their hands if they were passing in front of the gadi or dora.

A famous line which is repeated by the oppressed was “Banchen Dora née Kalmoktha (I am your slave my lord, I bow to your feet). Shyam Benegal's films Ankur and Nishant depict Telangana's feudalism grahically. A Telugu film blockbuster, Maa Bhoomi, showed the society under feudal lords. 

The Srikrishna committee on Telangana says in its findings that there is still gross injustice to the land tillers of the region, the villains, in this case, were landlords of Telangana and not those of other regions.

Kerala 

There were a number of feudal states in Kerala in the Middle Ages and Early Modern Era between the rule of Chera dynasty and the British rule (smaller feudal estates remained even during British rule). In Kerala, Kshatriyas, Nairs, and Samantha Kshatriyas were prominent during feudalism. Nairs acted as both feudals as well as warriors.

Madras Presidency 

Several zamindaris were established in the Madras Presidency (present-day Tamil Nadu and adjoining areas) from 1799 onwards.  The largest of these were Arni, Ramnad, Ganapur and Sivaganga. The zamindari settlement was based on a similar settlement established in Bengal. The Zamindari settlement of Madras was largely unsuccessful and was wrapped up in 1852. However, a few Zamindaris remained till India's independence in 1947.

North Arcot
North Arcot region was under Jagirdars until the Indian independence. The largest estate was that of Arni, a deshastha royal family. Arni estate was larger than Sandur princely state.

Northern Andhra
The Northern Andhra region was under  Telaga doras until the Indian Independence. The largest estate was that of Vizianagram under the Poosapati kshatriya family which was liberal and enlightened.

Rayalaseema
The Rayalaseema region was under Ayyagaru until the independence. The largest estate was that of Panyam; which was ruled by a deshastha royal family of Vishvamitra gotra and was liberal and enlightened.

Vidarbha

The feudal lords in Vidarbha region are notorious for their oppressive rule.

In literature
 Indian Feudalism by Ram Sharan Sharma
 Saraswatichandra by Govardhanram Madhavaram Tripathi, later adapted into film by the same name in 1968.

See also
 Debt bondage in India
 Caste system in India
 Feudalism in Pakistan
 Princely states of India

References

Bibliography

R.S. Sharma, Perspectives in Social and Economic History of Early India, paperback edn., (Munshiram Manoharlal, Delhi, 2003). Translated into Hindi, Russian and Bengali. Gujarati, Kannada, Malayalam, Marathi, Tamil and Telugu translations projected.
R.S. Sharma, Material Culture and Social Formations in Ancient India, (Macmillan Publishers, Delhi, 1985). Translated into Hindi, Russian and Bengali. Gujarati, Kannada, Malayalam, Marathi, Tamil and Telugu translations projected.
R.S. Sharma, Urban Decay in India (c.300-1000), (Munshiram Manoharlal, Delhi, 1987). Translated into Hindi and Bengali
R.S. Sharma, Early Medieval Indian Society: A Study in Feudalisation (Orient Longman Publishers Pvt. Ltd., Delhi, 2003)
R.S. Sharma, India's Ancient Past, (Oxford University Press, 2005)
R.S. Sharma, Indian Feudalism (Macmillan Publishers India Ltd., 3rd Revised Edition, Delhi, 2005)
R.S. Sharma, The State and Varna Formations in the Mid-Ganga Plains: An Ethnoarchaeological View (New Delhi, Manohar, 1996)
R.S. Sharma, Origin of the State in India (Dept. of History, University of Bombay, 1989)
R.S. Sharma, Land Revenue in India: Historical Studies, Motilal Banarsidass, Delhi, 1971
 Historiography of Indian Feudalism Towards a Model of Early Medieval Indian Economy, C. A.D. 600-1000, by Vijay Kumar Thakur. Commonwealth Publishers, 1989. .
 Dora and. Gadi: Manifestation of Landlord Domination in Telangana, I Thirumali, 1992
 Against Dora and Nizam : People's Movement in Telangana 1939-1948, I Thirumali
 "Chillarollu's Defiances in Telangana, 1900-1944" Indian Historical Review, XXII, 1995-1996
 Origin and Growth of Feudalism in Early India: From the Mauryas to AD 650, by Gian Chand Chauhan. Munshiram Manoharlal Publishers, 2004. .

 
Caste system in India
Debt bondage in South Asia